In geometry, the infinite-order apeirogonal tiling is a regular tiling of the hyperbolic plane. It has Schläfli symbol of {∞,∞}, which means it has countably infinitely many apeirogons around all its ideal vertices.

Symmetry 
This tiling represents the fundamental domains of *∞∞ symmetry.

Uniform colorings 
This tiling can also be alternately colored in the [(∞,∞,∞)] symmetry from 3 generator positions.

Related polyhedra and tiling 
The union of this tiling and its dual can be seen as orthogonal red and blue lines here, and combined define the lines of a *2∞2∞ fundamental domain.

 a{∞,∞} or  =  ∪

See also

Tilings of regular polygons
List of uniform planar tilings
List of regular polytopes

References
 John H. Conway, Heidi Burgiel, Chaim Goodman-Strass, The Symmetries of Things 2008,  (Chapter 19, The Hyperbolic Archimedean Tessellations)

External links 

 Hyperbolic and Spherical Tiling Gallery
 KaleidoTile 3: Educational software to create spherical, planar and hyperbolic tilings
 Hyperbolic Planar Tessellations, Don Hatch

Apeirogonal tilings
Hyperbolic tilings
Infinite-order tilings
Isogonal tilings
Isohedral tilings
Regular tilings
Self-dual tilings